Kampor  is a village in Croatia.

History 
During World War II, the Rab concentration camp was built near the village. After the war, a memorial was built at this location by Slovenian architect Edvard Ravnikar.

References

Populated places in Primorje-Gorski Kotar County
Rab